Dismukes is a surname. Notable people with the surname include:

Andrew Dismukes (born 1995), American comedian
Dizzy Dismukes (1890–1961), American baseball player and manager
John Taylor Dismukes, artist
Reese Dismukes (born 1992), American football player

See also
Aaron Dismuke (born 1992), American voice actor